Arapenta Lingka Poerba (born 1 November 1998) is an Indonesian professional footballer who plays as an attacking or central midfielder for Liga 1 club Persis Solo.

Club career

Bali United
On 18 January 2018, Arapenta officially signed a year contract with Liga 1 club Bali United after being promoted from Bali United U-19 and introduced as a trial player on 4 December 2017. He made his official debut with Bali United in a 3–0 win against Blitar United in Piala Indonesia when he came as a substitute for Miftahul Hamdi. He made his official debut in Liga 1 for Bali United, replacing Fadil Sausu in the match against Badak Lampung on 22 October 2019.

Sulut United (loan)
On 31 March 2018, Arapenta was loaned out to Sulut United for the 2018 season along with two other players to gain first-team experience.

Persis Solo (loan)
On 3 May 2021, Arapenta was loaned out to Persis Solo for the 2021–22 season. Arapenta made his first 2021–22 Liga 2 debut on 26 September 2021, coming on as a starter in a 2–0 win with PSG Pati at the Manahan Stadium, Surakarta.

Honours

Club
Bali United
 Liga 1: 2019
Persis Solo
 Liga 2: 2021

References

External links
Arapenta Lingka Poerba at Bali United Official Website

1998 births
Living people
Indonesian footballers
Bali United F.C. players
Persis Solo players
Liga 1 (Indonesia) players
Liga 2 (Indonesia) players
Association football midfielders
People from Bekasi
Sportspeople from West Java
21st-century Indonesian people